Sir Thomas Smith (23 December 151312 August 1577) was an English scholar, parliamentarian and diplomat.

Early life

Born at Saffron Walden in Essex, Smith was the second son of John Smith of Walden by Agnes, daughter of John Charnock of Lancashire. The Smiths of Essex are said to be descendants of Sir Roger de Clarendon, an illegitimate son of the Black Prince. He was educated at Queens' College, Cambridge, where he became a Fellow in 1530, and, in 1533, was appointed a public reader or professor. He lectured in the schools on natural philosophy, and on Greek in his own College. In 1540, Smith went abroad, and, after studying in France and Italy and taking a degree in law at the University of Padua, he returned to Cambridge in 1542.

He took the lead in the reform of the pronunciation of Greek, his views being universally adopted after considerable controversy. He and his friend, Sir John Cheke, were the great classical scholars of the time in England. In January 1543/44 he was appointed the first Regius Professor of Civil Law. He was vice-chancellor of the university the same year. In 1547, he became Provost of Eton College and Dean of Carlisle Cathedral.

Sir Thomas was an early convert to Protestantism, which brought him into prominence when Edward VI came to the throne. During the protectorate of Edward Seymour, 1st Duke of Somerset, he entered public life and was made the Secretary of State, and was sent on an important diplomatic mission to Brussels. In 1548, he was knighted. On the accession of Queen Mary I he lost all his offices, but in the reign of her sister, Elizabeth I, he was prominently employed in public affairs.

He was returned as Member of Parliament for Liverpool in 1559. It became clear that he supported the religious settlement and Confessions of Westminster (1560), sitting on two committees of Inquiry. When an expert handler of the son of the King of Sweden visiting Westminster, he was sent in 1562 as ambassador to France as an emerging diplomatic talent; he remained in France from September 1562 with experienced envoy Sir Nicholas Throckmorton. 

In 1572, Smith again went to France in the same capacity for a short time. However Smith came to dagger blows with Throckmorton over character and policy differences. He finally returned home in disgrace after suffering illness in April 1566. Nonetheless, Smith remained one of Elizabeth's most trusted Protestant counsellors. He had long been a friend of Sir William Cecil. Ennobled as Lord Burghley, Cecil appointed Smith to the Privy Council, only a month before he was elected to Commons as a knight of the shire for Essex. Smith, a prime mover behind the Conformity Bills, sought to restrain extremism and secure a subsidy from his fellow members. But when he proposed that the bishops be consulted, the puritan William Fleetwood defeated his motion. As a Privy Councillor he was influential on a number of committees. He spoke on the Treason Bill on the floor of the house, and examined witnesses to the Catholic plot led by the Duke of Norfolk. He was noted as upholding a religious objection to torture. His outstanding work elevated him to the higher ministerial echelons: in 1572 he was appointed Chancellor of the Order of the Garter and in July, principal secretary.

Failed colony in Ireland
In 1571, Elizabeth I granted Smith  of East Ulster. The empty lands were to be used to plant English settlers in an effort to control areas claimed by Clandeboye O'Neill territory and thus control the native Irish. The grant included all of the area known today as North Down and the Ards, apart from the southern tip of the Ards peninsula which was controlled by the Anglo-Norman Savage family.

Unfortunately for Smith, the booklet he printed to advertise his new lands was read by the Clandeboye O'Neill chief, Sir Brian MacPhelim, who just a few years earlier had been knighted by Elizabeth. Furious at what he saw as her "duplicity" in secretly arranging for the colonisation of unsettled areas claimed by O'Neill, he burned down all the major buildings in the area. The owners objected, but could do nothing. This made it difficult for the plantation to take hold. Then launching a wave of attacks on these early English settlers when they arrived, the O'Neills scorched the land Smith was to develop,  burning abbeys, monasteries and churches, and leaving Clandeboye "totally waste and void of inhabitants".

Smith, who was also a Member of Parliament for Essex in 1571 and 1572, died on 12 August 1577 at Hill Hall in Essex.

Marriages and heirs
Smith married twice.  First he wed Elizabeth Carkeke, daughter of a London printer, April 15, 1548; she died in 1553.  His second marriage, which took place July 23, 1554, was to Philippa Wilford, the widow of Sir John Hampden of Great Hampden, Buckinghamshire, and the daughter of the London merchant Henry Wilford.  She died 15 June 1578.

Smith had no issue by either marriage, although he had one illegitimate son named Thomas, who was killed during the failed Ards settlement. His heirs were his younger brother, George, and George's son, Sir William Smith (died 12 December 1626) of Theydon Mount, Essex. Sir William Smith's daughter, Frances Smith, married Sir Matthew Brend, owner of the land on which the first and second Globe Theatres were built. Edward de Vere, 17th Earl of Oxford, was brought up in Smith's house and his early education was supervised by him.

Works
In it, he described England as a mixed government and a commonwealth, and stated that all commonwealths are of mixed character.

Smith also authored De recta & emendata lingvæ Anglicæ scriptione, dialogus (Correct and Improved English Writing, a Dialogue, 1568).

Notes

Bibliography
.
.
.
.
.

Attribution:

Further reading
.

External links

 

1513 births
1577 deaths
16th-century English diplomats
Alumni of Queens' College, Cambridge
Ambassadors of England to France
Chancellors of the Order of the Garter
Clerks of the Privy Council
Converts to Protestantism from Roman Catholicism
English knights
English MPs 1547–1552
English MPs 1553 (Mary I)
English MPs 1559
English MPs 1571
English MPs 1572–1583
Fellows of Queens' College, Cambridge
Linguists of English
Lords Privy Seal
Members of the pre-1707 English Parliament for constituencies in Cornwall
People from Saffron Walden
Members of the Parliament of England (pre-1707) for Liverpool
Provosts of Eton College
Regius Professors of Civil Law (University of Cambridge)
Secretaries of State of the Kingdom of England
University of Padua alumni
Vice-Chancellors of the University of Cambridge
English Renaissance humanists
16th-century English lawyers
Knights Bachelor